The year 1939 in film is widely considered the greatest year in film history. The ten Best Picture-nominated films that year include classics in multiple genres.

Top-grossing films (U.S.)
The top ten 1939 released films by box office gross in North America are as follows:

Events 
Film historians often rate 1939 as "the greatest year in the history of Hollywood". Hollywood films produced in Southern California were at the height of their Golden Age (in spite of many cheaply made or undistinguished films also being produced, something to be expected with any year in commercial cinema), and during 1939 there are the premieres of an outstandingly large number of exceptional motion pictures, many of which become honored as all-time classic films.

 June 10 – MGM's first successful animated character, Barney Bear, made his debut in The Bear That Couldn't Sleep.
 August 15 – The Wizard of Oz premiered at Grauman's Chinese Theatre in Los Angeles.
 October 17 – Mr. Smith Goes to Washington premiered in Washington, D.C.
 December 15 – Gone with the Wind premiered in Atlanta, Georgia, with a three-day-long festival.
 March 31 – Release of the 20th Century Fox film version of The Hound of the Baskervilles, first of a Sherlock Holmes film series starring Basil Rathbone as Sherlock Holmes and Nigel Bruce as Dr. Watson.
 Canada established a National Film Commission, predecessor of the National Film Board of Canada, with John Grierson as first Commissioner.

Nominations for the Academy Award for Best Picture and Director 

The year 1939 was one in which the Academy of Motion Picture Arts and Sciences nominated ten films for Best Picture:

 Dark Victory
 Gone with the Wind (Best Picture winner)
 Goodbye, Mr. Chips
 Love Affair
 Mr. Smith Goes to Washington
 Ninotchka
 Of Mice and Men
 Stagecoach
 The Wizard of Oz
 Wuthering Heights

These films came from a wide variety of film genres and sources for their stories and settings, including: historical fiction (Gone with the Wind), contemporary affairs (Mr. Smith Goes to Washington and Of Mice and Men), love stories, classic novels (Wuthering Heights), fantasies/musicals, (The Wizard of Oz), tragic plays (Dark Victory), westerns (Stagecoach), and comedies (Ninotchka).

Each of the five nominees for Best Director of 1939 were or went on to become a legendary film director with multiple acclaimed films to his credit: Frank Capra (previous winner of the award), Victor Fleming, John Ford (who won a record four Best Director awards), Sam Wood, and William Wyler (who leads all directors in nominations with 11 while having three wins).

Academy Awards

 Best Picture: Gone with the Wind – David O. Selznick; Selznick International, MGM
 Best Director: Victor Fleming – Gone with the Wind
 Best Actor: Robert Donat – Goodbye, Mr. Chips
 Best Actress: Vivien Leigh – Gone with the Wind
 Best Supporting Actor: Thomas Mitchell – Stagecoach
 Best Supporting Actress: Hattie McDaniel – Gone with the Wind (first African American to win an Academy Award)
Gone with the Wind receives in all ten Academy Awards (eight competitive, two honorary) from thirteen nominations.

1939 film releases
United States

January–March
January 1939
13 January
Son of Frankenstein
14 January
Jesse James
27 January
Idiot's Delight
28 January
They Made Me a Criminal
February 1939
3 February
Honolulu
10 February
The Adventures of Huckleberry Finn
Made for Each Other
17 February
Gunga Din
The Three Musketeers
March 1939
3 March
Stagecoach
10 March
The Ice Follies of 1939
13 March
Rough Riders' Round-up
17 March
The Little Princess
24 March
Midnight
Three Smart Girls Grow Up
Wuthering Heights, premieres in Los Angeles CA, for US released on April 13
29 March
The Story of Vernon and Irene Castle
31 March
The Hound of the Baskervilles

April–June
April 1939
7 April
Love Affair
The Flying Irishman
Wuthering Heights
8 April
Dodge City
11 April
Buck Rogers
14 April
The Story of Alexander Graham Bell
16 April
The Face at the Window
22 April
Dark Victory
29 April
A Girl Must Live
May 1939
5 May
Rose of Washington Square
Sorority House
6 May
Confessions of a Nazi Spy
19 May
It's a Wonderful World
20 May
You Can't Get Away With Murder
25 May
Only Angels Have Wings
26 May
The Gorilla
June 1939
2 June
The Girl From Mexico
9 June
Young Mr. Lincoln
10 June
Juarez
16 June
Tarzan Finds a Son!
20 June
Good Girls Go to Paris
23 June
Five Came Back
30 June
Bachelor Mother
The Four Just Men

July–September
July 1939
4 July
Beau Geste
7 July
On Borrowed Time
13 July
The Man in the Iron Mask
21 July
Andy Hardy Gets Spring Fever
28 July
Goodbye, Mr. Chips
Frontier Marshal
August 1939
4 August
The Four Feathers
6 August
Cheer Boys Cheer
11 August
Lady of the Tropics
18 August
In Name Only
19 August
Each Dawn I Die
25 August
The Wizard of Oz
26 August
The Angels Wash Their Faces
28 August
Ask a Policeman
Daughter of the Tong
September 1939
1 September
The Women
The Adventures of Sherlock Holmes
2 September
The Old Maid
5 September
Golden Boy
8 September
Blackmail
Full Confession
9 September
Charlie Chan at Treasure Island
15 September
The Rains Came
22 September
Fifth Avenue Girl
29 September
The Arizona Kid
Dancin' Co-Ed
Honeymoon in Bali

October–December
October 1939
6 October
Intermezzo: A Love Story
13 October
Babes in Arms
Jamaica Inn
19 October
Mr. Smith Goes to Washington
20 October
At the Circus
23 October
The Roaring Twenties
November 1939
3 November
The Flying Deuces
10 November
Allegheny Uprising
The Cat and the Canary
Drums Along the Mohawk
First Love
11 November
The Private Lives of Elizabeth and Essex
17 November
Another Thin Man
Tower of London
22 November
The Amazing Mr. Williams
23 November
Ninotchka
December 1939
2 December
The Return of Doctor X
8 December
Barricade
15 December
Gone With the Wind
16 December
Zorro's Fighting Legion
22 December
Everything Happens at Night
Gulliver's Travels
29 December
Destry Rides Again
The Hunchback of Notre Dame
Swanee River

Notable films released in 1939
United States unless stated

A
The Adventures of Huckleberry Finn, starring Mickey Rooney and Rex Ingram
The Adventures of Sherlock Holmes, starring Basil Rathbone and Nigel Bruce
Allegheny Uprising, starring Claire Trevor and John Wayne
Andy Hardy Gets Spring Fever, starring Lewis Stone, Mickey Rooney, Cecilia Parker, Fay Holden
The Angels Wash Their Faces, starring Ann Sheridan and the Dead End Kids
The Amazing Mr. Williams, starring Melvyn Douglas and Joan Blondell
Another Thin Man, starring William Powell and Myrna Loy
The Arizona Kid, starring Roy Rogers
The Arsenal Stadium Mystery – (GB)
Ask a Policeman, starring Will Hay, Graham Moffatt and Moore Marriott – (GB)
At the Circus, starring the Marx Brothers

B
Babes in Arms, directed by Busby Berkeley, starring Mickey Rooney and Judy Garland
Bachelor Mother, starring Ginger Rogers and David Niven
Bad Lands, starring Robert Barrat and Robert Coote
Barricade, starring Alice Faye and Warner Baxter
Beau Geste, directed by William Wellman, starring Gary Cooper and Ray Milland
Bel Ami – (Germany)
Blackmail, starring Edward G. Robinson
Blue Montana Skies, starring Gene Autry
Boy Slaves
Boys' Reformatory, starring Frankie Darro
The Bronze Buckaroo, starring Herb Jeffries

C
The Cat and the Canary, starring Bob Hope and Paulette Goddard
Cesta do hlubin študákovy duše – (Czechoslovakia)
Charlie Chan at Treasure Island, starring Sidney Toler
Charlie Chan in Reno, starring Sidney Toler and Ricardo Cortez
Cheer Boys Cheer, starring Nova Pilbeam (GB)
Confessions of a Nazi Spy, starring Edward G. Robinson, Francis Lederer, George Sanders, Paul Lukas

D
Dark Victory, starring Bette Davis, George Brent, Humphrey Bogart, Geraldine Fitzgerald, Ronald Reagan
Daughter of the Tong, starring Evelyn Brent and Grant Withers
Days of Jesse James, directed by Joseph Kane, starring Roy Rogers
Destry Rides Again, directed by George Marshall, starring Marlene Dietrich and James Stewart
Dodge City, directed by Michael Curtiz, starring Errol Flynn and Olivia de Havilland
Drums Along the Mohawk, directed by John Ford, starring Henry Fonda and Claudette Colbert

E
Each Dawn I Die, starring James Cagney and George Raft
The Empress Wu Tse-tien – (China)
Eva tropí hlouposti (Eva Fools Around) – (Czechoslovakia)
Everything Happens at Night, starring Sonja Henie and Ray Milland
Fifth Ave Girl, starring Ginger Rogers and Walter Connolly

F
The Face at the Window, starring Tod Slaughter
First Love, starring Deanna Durbin and Robert Stack
Five Came Back, directed by John Farrow, starring Lucille Ball and Chester Morris
The Flying Deuces, directed by A. Edward Sutherland, starring Laurel and Hardy
The Flying Irishman, starring Douglas Corrigan
The Four Feathers, starring John Clements and Ralph Richardson – (GB)
The Four Just Men, directed by Walter Forde (GB)
Frontier Marshal, starring Randolph Scott, Caesar Romero, John Carradine
Full Confession, starring Victor McLaglen

G
The Girl from Mexico, starring Lupe Vélez
A Girl Must Live, directed by Carol Reed, starring Margaret Lockwood – (GB)
Golden Boy, starring Barbara Stanwyck, William Holden, Adolphe Menjou
Gone with the Wind, directed by Victor Fleming, starring Vivien Leigh, Clark Gable, Olivia de Havilland, Leslie Howard, Hattie McDaniel – Academy Awards for best picture, director, actress and supporting actress
Goodbye, Mr. Chips, directed by Sam Wood, starring Robert Donat and Greer Garson. Academy Award for best actor. – (GB)
Gulliver's Travels, starring Jessica Dragonette and Lanny Ross
Gunga Din, directed by George Stevens, starring Cary Grant, Victor McLaglen, Douglas Fairbanks Jr., Sam Jaffe

H
The Hardys Ride High, starring Lewis Stone, Mickey Rooney, Cecilia Parker, Fay Holden
Heaven with a Barbed Wire Fence, starring Glenn Ford
Hello Janine!, starring Marika Rökk – (Germany)
Hollywood Cavalcade, starring Alice Faye, Don Ameche, J. Edward Bromberg, Alan Curtis
Honolulu, starring Eleanor Powell, Burns and Allen
The Hound of the Baskervilles, first in Sherlock Holmes series starring Basil Rathbone and Nigel Bruce
The Hunchback of Notre Dame, directed by William Dieterle, starring Charles Laughton and Maureen O'Hara

I
I Met a Murderer, starring James Mason – (GB)
Idiot's Delight, starring Clark Gable and Norma Shearer
In Name Only, starring Cary Grant, Carole Lombard, Kay Francis
Inspector Hornleigh on Holiday, starring Gordon Harker and Alastair Sim – (GB)
Intermezzo, starring Ingrid Bergman and Leslie Howard
It's a Wonderful World, directed by W. S. Van Dyke, starring James Stewart and Claudette Colbert

J
Jamaica Inn, directed by Alfred Hitchcock, starring Charles Laughton and Maureen O'Hara – (GB)
Jesse James, starring Tyrone Power, Henry Fonda, Nancy Kelly, Randolph Scott
Juarez, starring Paul Muni, Bette Davis, Claude Rains, John Garfield, Brian Aherne
Le Jour se lève (Daybreak), directed by Marcel Carné, starring Jean Gabin and Arletty – (France)
Judge Hardy and Son, starring Lewis Stone, Mickey Rooney, Cecilia Parker, Fay Holden

K
King of the Underworld, starring Humphrey Bogart and Kay Francis

L
The Lambeth Walk, directed by Albert de Courville, starring Lupino Lane and Sally Gray – (GB)
The Last Turning (Le Dernier Tournant), starring Michel Simon – (France)
Lenin in 1918 (Lenin v 1918 godu) – (USSR)
Let Us Live, starring Maureen O'Sullivan and Henry Fonda
The Little Princess, starring Shirley Temple and Richard Greene
Love Affair, starring Irene Dunne and Charles Boyer (Academy Award nominee)
Lucky Night, starring Myrna Loy and Robert Taylor

M
Made For Each Other, starring Carole Lombard, James Stewart, and Charles Coburn
Maisie, starring Robert Young and Ann Sothern
The Man in the Iron Mask, starring Louis Hayward, Joan Bennett, Warren William
Man of Conquest, starring Richard Dix, Gail Patrick, Joan Fontaine
Mexicali Rose, starring Gene Autry
Midnight, starring Claudette Colbert and Don Ameche
The Mikado, a Gilbert and Sullivan operetta, first British film shot in Technicolor – (GB)
Million Dollar Legs, starring Betty Grable
Mr. Moto Takes a Vacation, starring Peter Lorre
Mr. Smith Goes to Washington, directed by Frank Capra, starring James Stewart, Jean Arthur, Claude Rains
Mr. Wong in Chinatown, starring Boris Karloff
The Mystery of Mr. Wong, starring Boris Karloff

N
Nancy Drew and the Hidden Staircase, starring Bonita Granville
Never Say Die, starring Martha Raye and Bob Hope
Ninotchka, directed by Ernst Lubitsch, starring Greta Garbo, Melvyn Douglas, Ina Claire, Bela Lugosi

O
Of Mice and Men, directed by Lewis Milestone, starring Burgess Meredith, Betty Field, Lon Chaney Jr.
Oily to Bed, Oily to Rise, a comedy short starring The Three Stooges
The Oklahoma Kid, starring James Cagney, Humphrey Bogart, Donald Crisp
The Old Maid, starring Bette Davis and Miriam Hopkins
On Borrowed Time, starring Lionel Barrymore and Cedric Hardwicke
On Dress Parade, starring The Dead End Kids
On the Night of the Fire (aka The Fugitive), starring Ralph Richardson – (GB)
On Your Toes, screenplay by Lawrence Riley, starring Vera Zorina and Eddie Albert
Only Angels Have Wings, starring Cary Grant, Rita Hayworth and Jean Arthur

P
Prisioneros de la tierra (Prisoners of the Land) – (Argentina)
The Private Lives of Elizabeth and Essex, starring Bette Davis, Errol Flynn, Olivia de Havilland

Q
Q Planes, starring Ralph Richardson and Laurence Olivier – (GB)

R
The Rains Came, starring Tyrone Power and Myrna Loy
Range War, a Hopalong Cassidy western starring William Boyd
Remember?, starring Greer Garson, Robert Taylor, Lew Ayres 
The Return of Doctor X, a horror film starring Humphrey Bogart
The Roaring Twenties, starring James Cagney, Priscilla Lane, Humphrey Bogart
The Rules of the Game (La règle du jeu), directed by Jean Renoir – (France)

S
The Saint in London, starring George Sanders
The Saint Strikes Back, starring George Sanders
Seven Little Australians, directed by Arthur Greville Collins – (Australia)
Son of Frankenstein, starring Basil Rathbone, Boris Karloff, Bela Lugosi
De Spooktrein (The Ghost Train) – (Netherlands)
The Spy in Black, directed by Michael Powell, starring Conrad Veidt and Valerie Hobson – (GB)
Stagecoach, directed by John Ford, starring John Wayne, Claire Trevor, Berton Churchill, John Carradine
Stanley and Livingstone, starring Spencer Tracy and Cedric Hardwicke
The Story of the Last Chrysanthemums (Zangiku monogatari), directed by Kenji Mizoguchi – (Japan)
The Story of Vernon and Irene Castle, starring Fred Astaire and Ginger Rogers
Susannah of the Mounties, starring Shirley Temple and Randolph Scott
Swanee River, starring Don Ameche

T
Tarzan Finds a Son!, starring Johnny Weissmuller
 These Glamour Girls, starring Lew Ayres, Lana Turner, Tom Brown
They Made Me a Criminal, starring John Garfield
They Shall Have Music, starring Jascha Heifetz, Joel McCrea, Andrea Leeds, Walter Brennan
The Three Musketeers, starring Don Ameche and The Ritz Brothers
Three Smart Girls Grow Up, starring Deanna Durbin and Robert Cummings
Three Texas Steers, directed by George Sherman, starring John Wayne
Tower of London, starring Basil Rathbone, Boris Karloff, Vincent Price
Tsuchi (Japan)
The Trip to Tilsit (Die Reise nach Tilsit) – (Germany)

U
Union Pacific, directed by Cecil B. DeMille, starring Barbara Stanwyck and Joel McCrea

V
Vasilisa the Beautiful (Vasilisa prekrasnaya) – (U.S.S.R.)
The Vyborg Side (Vyborgskaya storona) – (U.S.S.R.)

W
Way Down South, directed by Leslie Goodwins and Bernard Vorhaus
Wilton's Zoo (Boefje), directed by Douglas Sirk – (Netherlands)
The Wizard of Oz, directed by Victor Fleming, starring Judy Garland, Frank Morgan, Ray Bolger, Bert Lahr, Jack Haley, Margaret Hamilton
The Women, directed by George Cukor, starring Norma Shearer, Joan Crawford, Rosalind Russell
Wuthering Heights, directed by William Wyler, starring Merle Oberon, Laurence Olivier, David Niven, Flora Robson
Wyoming Outlaw, starring John Wayne, directed by George Sherman

Y
You Can't Cheat an Honest Man, starring W. C. Fields
Young Man's Fancy, directed by Robert Stevenson, starring Anna Lee – (GB)
Young Mr. Lincoln, directed by John Ford, starring Henry Fonda and Alice Brady

Z
Zenobia, directed by Gordon Douglas, starring Oliver Hardy
Zorro's Fighting Legion, starring Reed Hadley

Serials 
 Buck Rogers, starring Buster Crabbe
 Dick Tracy's G-Men, starring Ralph Byrd
 Daredevils of the Red Circle, starring Herman Brix and Charles B. Middleton
 Flying G-Men
 The Lone Ranger Rides Again
 Mandrake the Magician, starring Warren Hull
 The Oregon Trail
 Overland with Kit Carson
 The Phantom Creeps, starring Bela Lugosi
 Scouts to the Rescue
 Zorro's Fighting Legion, starring Reed Hadley

Comedy film series 
Charlie Chaplin (1914–1940)
Lupino Lane (1915–1939)
Buster Keaton (1917–1944)
Laurel and Hardy (1927–1945)
Our Gang (1922–1944)
The Marx Brothers (1929–1946)
The Three Stooges (1934–1959)

Animated short film series 
 Krazy Kat (1925–1940)
 Mickey Mouse (1928–1953)
 Silly Symphonies (1929–1939)
 The Practical Pig
 The Ugly Duckling
 Looney Tunes (1930–1969)
 Terrytoons (1930–1964)
 Merrie Melodies (1931–1969)
 Scrappy (1931–1941)
 Betty Boop (1932–1939)
 Popeye (1933–1957)
 Color Rhapsodies (1934–1949)
 Donald Duck (1937–1956)
 Barney Bear (1939–1954) 
 Walter Lantz Cartunes (also known as New Universal Cartoons or Cartune Comedies) (1938–1942)
 The Captain and the Kids (1938–1939)
 Goofy (1939–1955)
 Andy Panda (1939–1949)
 Nertsery Rhyme Cartoons (1939 only)
 Crackpot Cruise Cartoons (1939 only)
 Lil' Eightball (1939 only)
 Count Screwloose and J.R. (1939 only)

Births 
January 8 – Ruth Maleczech, American actress (died 2013)
January 9 – Susannah York, English actress (died 2011)
January 10 – Sal Mineo, American actor (died 1976)
January 17 – Maury Povich, American television personality
January 22 – Sonny Chiba, Japanese actor and martial artist (died 2021)
January 26 – Scott Glenn, American actor
January 30 – János Zsombolyai, Hungarian cinematographer, film director and screenwriter (died 2015)
February 3 – Michael Cimino, American director, producer and screenwriter (died 2016)
February 6 – Mike Farrell, American actor
February 9 – Janet Suzman, South African actress and director
February 16 – Angelo Infanti, Italian actor (died 2010)
February 20 – Antonina Girycz, Polish actress (died 2022)
February 24 – Marisa Mell, Austrian actress (died 1992)
February 28 – Tommy Tune, American dancer, choreographer and actor
March 4
John Moreno, British actor
Robert Shaye, American actor and producer
Carlos Vereza, Brazilian actor
March 5
Samantha Eggar, English actress
Benyamin Sueb, Indonesian actor, comedian and singer (died 1995)
March 7 – Michael Chow (restaurateur), Chinese-born British-American former actor
March 14 – Héctor Bonilla, Mexican actor (died 2022)
March 21 – Marino Masé, Italian actor (died 2022)
March 28 – Vic Vargas, Filipino actor (died 2003)
March 29 – Terence Hill, Italian actor, director, screenwriter and producer
April 1 – Ali MacGraw, American actress
April 5 – Roger Davis, American actor
April 7 – Francis Ford Coppola, director; producer; screenwriter
April 9 – Romeo Vasquez, Filipino actor (died 2017)
April 11 – Louise Lasser, American actress, writer and director
April 13 – Paul Sorvino, American actor (died 2022)
April 22 – Mark Jones (actor), English actor (died 2010)
April 23
David Birney, American actor and director (died 2022)
Lee Majors, American actor
May 4 – Paul Gleason, American actor (died 2006)
May 7
Ruggero Deodato, Italian director and screenwriter (died 2022)
Marco St. John, American actor
May 13 – Harvey Keitel, American actor
May 15 – Barbara Hammer, American filmmaker (died 2019)
May 19
James Fox, English actor
Nancy Kwan, Chinese-American actress
May 22 – Paul Winfield, American actor (died 2004)
May 23 – Reinhard Hauff, German film director
May 25 – Ian McKellen, English actor
May 28 – Beth Howland, American actress (died 2015)
May 30 – Michael J. Pollard, American actor (died 2019)
June 4 – Henri Pachard, American film director (died 2008)
June 8 – Bernie Casey, American actor (died 2017)
June 11 – Christina Crawford, American actress
June 24 – Michael Gothard, English actor (died 1992)
June 25 – Barbara Montgomery, American actress and director
July 1
Karen Black, American actress, screenwriter and singer-songwriter (died 2013)
Ines Aru, Estonian actress
July 5 – Sergio Di Stefano, Italian actor and voice actor (died 2010)
July 15
Abdulhussain Abdulredha, Kuwaiti actor (died 2017)
Patrick Wayne, American actor
July 16 – Corin Redgrave, British actor, political activist (died 2010)
July 21 – Sondra James, American sound coordinator and actress (died 2021)
July 28 – Charles Cyphers, American actor
July 30 – Peter Bogdanovich, American director, producer and screenwriter (died 2022)
July 31 – France Nuyen, French actress
August 1 – Terry Kiser, American actor
August 2
Wes Craven, American director; producer; screenwriter (died 2015)
Robert Wall, American actor and martial artist (died 2022)
August 4 – Mapita Cortés, Mexican actress (died 2006)
August 7 – Anjanette Comer, American actress
August 9 – Bulle Ogier, French actress
August 12
Oliver Ford Davies, English actor and writer
George Hamilton, American actor
August 20 – Fernando Poe Jr., Filipino actor (died 2004)
August 23 – Fernando Luján, Mexican actor (died 2019)
August 25 – John Badham, English-American director
August 29 – Joel Schumacher, American film director, producer and screenwriter (died 2020)
August – Elizabeth Ashley, American actress
September 1 – Lily Tomlin, American actress; comedian; producer
September 5
William Devane, American actor
George Lazenby, Australian actor
September 11 – Tom Dreesen, American actor and stand-up comedian
September 13 – Richard Kiel, American actor and voice artist (died 2014)
September 23 – Janusz Gajos, Polish actor
September 27 – Garrick Hagon, Canadian film, stage, television and radio actor
September 30 – Len Cariou, Canadian actor and director
October 5 – Carmen Salinas, Mexican actress and comedian (died 2021)
October 6 – Ellen Travolta, American actress
October 8 – Paul Hogan, Australian comedian and actor
October 13 – Melinda Dillon, American actress (died 2023)
October 18 – Salme Poopuu, Estonian actress and filmmaker (died 2017)
October 22 – Tony Roberts, American actor
October 23 – Stanley Anderson, American character actor (died 2018)
October 24 – F. Murray Abraham, American actor
October 25 – Nikos Nikolaidis, Greek film director (died 2007)
October 27 – John Cleese, English actor, comedian and producer
October 28 – Jane Alexander, American actress
October 29 – Elizabeth Moody (actress), English-born New Zealand actress and director (died 2010)
October 31 – Ron Rifkin, American actor
November 1 - Barbara Bosson, American actress (died 2023)
November 8 – Meg Wynn Owen, Welsh actress (died 2022)
November 10 – Anton Gorchev, Bulgarian actor (died 2000)
November 15 – Yaphet Kotto, American actor (died 2021)
November 18 – Brenda Vaccaro, American actress
November 22 – Allen Garfield, American actor (died 2020)
November 23 – Denis Arndt, American actor
November 26
Mark Margolis, American actor
Tina Turner, American-born Swiss singer, songwriter and actress
December 13 – Akiko Wakabayashi, Japanese actress
December 27 – John Amos, American actor
December 28 – Gloria Manon, American actress (died 2018)

Deaths 
January 19 – Tom Ricketts, 86, English actor, director, Love Bound, Thrill of Youth
January 25 – Helen Ware, 61, American actress, Morning Glory, Abraham Lincoln
February 22 – Joe Brandt, 56, American film producer and co-founder of C.B.C. which became Columbia Pictures
April 22 – Ann Murdock, 48, American actress, Outcast, Please Help Emily
May 5 – Clara Schønfeld, 82, Danish actress, Master of the House, Praesten i Vejlby
June 9 – Owen Moore, 54, Irish actor, A Star is Born, She Done Him Wrong, The Red Mill, Cinderella
August 23 – Sidney Howard, 48, American writer, Gone with the Wind, Dodsworth, Arrowsmith, A Lady to Love
September 24 – Carl Laemmle, 72, German producer, Frankenstein, Dracula, Bride of Frankenstein, The Phantom of the Opera
October 13 – Ford Sterling, 55, American actor, Tango Tangles, The Show-Off, Between Showers
October 23 – Zane Grey, 67, American writer, Fighting Caravans, Riders of the Purple Sage, Western Union, Born to the West
October 28 – Alice Brady, 46, American actress, My Man Godfrey, Young Mr. Lincoln, The Gay Divorcee, In Old Chicago
November 7 – Kirsti Suonio, 67, Finnish stage and film actress, Substitute Wife
November 13 – George Nicholls, Jr., 42, American director, Anne of Green Gables, Man of Conquest
December 12 – Douglas Fairbanks, 56, American actor, The Thief of Bagdad, The Black Pirate, Robin Hood, Mr. Robinson Crusoe, and the father of Douglas Fairbanks, Jr.

Debuts
Dirk Bogarde – Come on George!
Richard Conte – Heaven with a Barbed Wire Fence
Peter Cushing – The Man in the Iron Mask
Linda Darnell – Hotel for Women
Peggy Ann Garner – In Name Only
Greer Garson – Goodbye, Mr. Chips
Anne Gwynne – Unexpected Father
Jennifer Jones – New Frontier
Mahmoud Zulfikar – Apple Seller
Veronica Lake – Sorority House
Marcello Mastroianni – Marionette
Victor Mature – The Housekeeper's Daughter
Gene Nelson – Second Fiddle
Edmond O'Brien – The Hunchback of Notre Dame

References

 
Film by year